The following lists events that happened during the year 1993 in Bosnia and Herzegovina.

Incumbents
President: Alija Izetbegović
Prime Minister: Mile Akmadžić (until October 25), Haris Silajdžić (starting October 25)

 
Years of the 20th century in Bosnia and Herzegovina
1990s in Bosnia and Herzegovina
Bosnia and Herzegovina
Bosnia and Herzegovina